Emil Schultz-Riga (1872 – 2 November 1931) was a Baltic Germans-Russian landscape painter of the Düsseldorf school of painting. He also worked with portraits and floral still lifes.

Life 

Born in Daugavpils, Russian Empire, Schultz-Riga studied from 1892 to 1895 at the Kunstakademie Düsseldorf. There, Heinrich Lauenstein, Hugo Crola, Johann Peter Theodor Janssen, Arthur Kampf and Adolf Schill were his teachers. Schultz-Riga was a member of the artists association Malkasten. He was represented at the Große Berliner Kunstausstellung in 1909.

Schultz-Riga died in Düsseldorf.

References

External links 
 Emil Schultz-Riga, auction result on artnet.de

19th-century German painters
19th-century German male artists
20th-century German painters
20th-century German male artists
German landscape painters
German portrait painters
German still life painters
Baltic-German people
1872 births
1931 deaths
People from Daugavpils